"Luck Be a Lady" is a song written and composed by Frank Loesser in 1950 and first performed by Robert Alda. The song was featured in the musical Guys and Dolls. The lyrics relate the point of view of a gambler, Sky Masterson, who hopes that he will win a bet, the outcome of which will decide whether or not he is able to save his relationship with the girl of his dreams.

Notable uses and recordings
Marlon Brando sang the song in the Guys and Dolls (1955) film adaptation. In 2004, that version finished at No. 42 in AFI's 100 Years...100 Songs survey of top tunes in American cinema.
Jack Jones recorded it for his album, Bewitched (1964), arranged by Shorty Rogers.
Later, it became a signature song for Frank Sinatra (who also starred in Guys and Dolls 1955 film adaptation), first released on the compilation Reprise Musical Repertory Theatre (1963) and re-released on the album Sinatra '65: The Singer Today (1965).
Barbra Streisand recorded the song for her album Back to Broadway (1993).
Sinatra released it as a duet with Chrissie Hynde on Duets II (1994).
Dee Snider performed it as a duet with Clay Aiken on Snider's album Dee Does Broadway (2012).
The Cherry Poppin' Daddies recorded a version on their Rat Pack tribute Please Return the Evening (2014).
Seal recorded it for his 2017 album Standards.

In popular culture
Advertising
In December 2011, Cîroc began airing an advertising campaign featuring Sean "Puff Daddy" Combs and others in scenes reminiscent of the original Rat Pack, with a recording of Frank Sinatra singing "Luck Be a Lady" playing throughout the commercial as mood music.

Films
Frank Sinatra's version features prominently in the film Mrs. Doubtfire (1993), when Robin Williams' character, Daniel Hillard, is given a makeover to "become" a woman. 
The song was used in the original sound track from The Cooler (2003), a movie which deals with casino life (and death) in Las Vegas.

Music
The electronica group Fila Brazillia references the song in the title of their album Luck Be a Weirdo Tonight (1997).

Television
One line is sung by the Doctor in the Doctor Who episode, "Rose" (March 26, 2005). 
Full House season 2, episodes 43 and 44, titled "Luck Be a Lady" (Parts 1 and 2), aired April 28, 1989 and May 5, 1989, respectively.
A cover of the song features in Lucifer, sung by the titular character.
"Luck Be a Lady" (October 24, 2017) is the title of season 4, episode 72 of The Flash. 
Brian Setzer performed the song on The L Words soundtrack in season 4, episode 6: "Luck Be a Lady" (February 11, 2007).
The song is parodied in The Simpsons episode "Mayored to the Mob" (December 20, 1998), as "Luke be a Jedi".
The song is featured briefly in The Marvelous Mrs. Maisel Season 3 Episode 3 "Panty Pose".
The song is performed by Adam Arkin in the episode "Brain Salad Surgery" of Chicago Hope.

References

External links
[ Allmusic Entry]

Songs about luck
Songs from Guys and Dolls
Songs from musicals
Songs written by Frank Loesser
Vocal duets
Pop standards
Barbra Streisand songs
Frank Sinatra songs